In the branch of abstract algebra called ring theory, the double centralizer theorem can refer to any one of several similar results. These results concern the centralizer of a subring S of a ring R, denoted CR(S) in this article. It is always the case that CR(CR(S)) contains S, and a double centralizer theorem gives conditions on R and S that guarantee that CR(CR(S)) is equal to S.

Statements of the theorem

Motivation
The centralizer of a subring S of R is given by

Clearly CR(CR(S)) ⊇ S, but it is not always the case that one can say the two sets are equal. The double centralizer theorems give conditions under which one can conclude that equality occurs.

There is another special case of interest. Let M be a right R module and give M the natural left E-module structure, where E is End(M), the ring of endomorphisms of the abelian group M. Every map mr given by mr(x) = xr creates an additive endomorphism of M, that is, an element of E. The map r → mr is a ring homomorphism of R into the ring E, and we denote the image of R inside of E by RM. It can be checked that the kernel of this canonical map is the annihilator Ann(MR). Therefore, by an isomorphism theorem for rings, RM is isomorphic to the quotient ring R/Ann(MR). Clearly when M is a faithful module, R and RM are isomorphic rings.

So now E is a ring with RM as a subring, and CE(RM) may be formed. By definition one can check that CE(RM) = End(MR), the ring of R module endomorphisms of M. Thus if it occurs that CE(CE(RM)) = RM, this is the same thing as saying CE(End(MR)) = RM.

Central simple algebras
Perhaps the most common version is the version for central simple algebras, as it appears in :

Theorem: If A is a finite-dimensional central simple algebra over a field F and B is a simple subalgebra of A, then CA(CA(B)) = B, and moreover the dimensions satisfy

Artinian rings
Given a simple R module UR, we will borrow notation from the above motivation section including RU and E=End(U). Additionally, we will write D=End(UR) for the subring of E consisting of R-homomorphisms. By Schur's lemma, D is a division ring.

Theorem: Let R be a right Artinian ring with a simple right module UR, and let RU, D and E be given as in the previous paragraph. Then
.

Remarks
 In this version, the rings are chosen with the intent of proving the Jacobson density theorem. Notice that it only concludes that a particular subring has the centralizer property, in contrast to the central simple algebra version.
 Since algebras are normally defined over commutative rings, and all the involved rings above may be noncommutative, it's clear that algebras are not necessarily involved.
 If U is additionally a faithful module, so that R is a right primitive ring, then RU is ring isomorphic to R.

Polynomial identity rings
In , a version is given for polynomial identity rings. The notation Z(R) will be used to denote the center of a ring R.

Theorem: If R is a simple polynomial identity ring, and A is a simple Z(R) subalgebra of R, then CR(CR(A)) = A.

Remarks
 This version can be considered to be "between" the central simple algebra version and the Artinian ring version. This is because simple polynomial identity rings are Artinian, but unlike the Artinian version, the conclusion still refers to all central simple subrings of R.

von Neumann Algebras
The Von Neumann bicommutant theorem states that a *-subalgebra A of the algebra of bounded operators B(H)  on a Hilbert space H is a von Neumann algebra (i.e. is weakly closed) if and only if A = CB(H)CB(H)(A).

Double centralizer property

A module M is said to have the double centralizer property or to be a balanced module if CE(CE(RM)) = RM, where E = End(M) and RM are as given in the motivation section. In this terminology, the Artinian ring version of the double centralizer theorem states that simple right modules for right Artinian rings are balanced modules.

Notes

References

 Reprint of the 1994 original

Theorems in ring theory